Raga Shahr-e Rey Futsal Club (Bashgah-e Futsal-e Raga-ye Shiherri) was an Iranian professional futsal club based in Ray.

History 

The club was founded in 2019 as Foodka Tehran. In the season of 2020–21 Iranian Futsal Super League it was renamed Raga Shahr-e Rey due to change of sponsorship.

Season to season

The table below chronicles the achievements of the Club in various competitions.

Last updated: 16 March 2022

Notes:
* unofficial titles
1 worst title in history of club

Key

P   = Played
W   = Games won
D   = Games drawn
L   = Games lost

GF  = Goals for
GA  = Goals against
Pts = Points
Pos = Final position

Honours 

Iran Futsal's 1st Division
 Winners (1): 2019–20

Players

Club captains

Managers

Last updated: 6 September 2022

References 

Futsal clubs in Iran
Sport in Tehran
2019 establishments in Iran
Futsal clubs established in 2019